Stefan Edberg (born 1966) is a Swedish tennis player.

Edberg may also refer to:
Edberg, Alberta, a village in Alberta, Canada

People with the surname
Alex Edberg (born 1991), Swedish speedway rider
Nancy Edberg (1832–1892), Swedish swimmer, swimming instructor and bath house director
Pelle Edberg (born 1979), Swedish professional golfer
Per Jonas Edberg (1878–1957), Swedish politician
Rolf Edberg (born 1950), Swedish retired ice hockey player
Stephen J. Edberg (born 1952), American scientist at the Jet Propulsion Laboratory